André Stafleu (born 21 February 1955 in Leidschendam) is a retired Dutch footballer who was active as a defender. Stafleu made his professional debut at Feyenoord and also played for Excelsior, Vitesse Arnhem, Willem II and HFC Haarlem. After his career he took control as a manager over FC Volendam and Sportclub Feyenoord (the amateur branch of Feyenoord), while he was a youth coach at Feyenoord for many years. He was assistant coach in Chinese Foolball Club Tianjin Teda in 2007.

Honours
 1979-80 : KNVB Cup winner with Feyenoord
 1983-84 : Eredivisie winner with Feyenoord
 1983-84 : KNVB Cup winner with Feyenoord
 First match: 7 June 1976 : Feyenoord - De Graafschap, 8-0

External links
 Profile

1955 births
Living people
Dutch footballers
Feyenoord players
Excelsior Rotterdam players
SBV Vitesse players
Willem II (football club) players
HFC Haarlem players
Eredivisie players
People from Leidschendam
Association football defenders
Footballers from South Holland